La Jacetania is a comarca in northern Aragon, Spain. It is located in the northwestern corner of the Huesca and Zaragoza provinces.
The administrative capital is Jaca, with 13,374 inhabitants the largest town of the comarca. The area is famous for its ski resorts.

Jacetania borders with France in the north and with Navarre in the west. Most of its territory is mountainous, with the ranges of the Pyrenees and Pre-Pyrenees covering most of its area. The name of the comarca originates in the ancient Iberian tribe of the Iacetani.

This comarca was the birthplace of the historic County of Aragon.

Municipal terms
The traditional names of the towns, when different from the official name, are in brackets.
Aísa
Candanchú
Esposa 
Sinués
Ansó 
Aragüés del Puerto (Aragüés de lo Puerto)
Artieda 
Ascara 
Bailo 
Borau 
Canal de Berdún (A Canal de Berdún)
Canfranc 
Canfranc Estación
Castiello de Jaca (Castiello de Chaca)
Aratorés
Fago 
Jaca (Chaca)
Jasa (Chasa)
Mianos (Mians)
Puente la Reina de Jaca (Puent d'a Reina de Chaca)
Salvatierra de Esca (Salvatierra d'Esca)
Santa Cilia 
Santa Cruz de la Serós (Santa Cruz d'as Serors)
Sigüés 
Valle de Hecho (Val d'Echo) 
Villanúa (Villanuga)

See also
County of Aragon
Pyrenees

References

 Official Map 
 Comarcas de Aragón, La jacetania

Comarcas of Aragon
Geography of the Province of Huesca
Geography of the Province of Zaragoza
Pyrenees